Fort Cox may refer to:
Fort Cox, West Virginia, in Hampshire County, West Virginia
Fort Cox, Eastern Cape, near Middledrift in the Eastern Cape, South Africa